Shubham Singh Pundir (born 16 October 1998) is an Indian cricketer who represents Jammu and Kashmir in domestic cricket.

Domestic career
He made his first-class debut for Jammu and Kashmir on 13 January 2015 in the 2014-15 Ranji Trophy. He made his Twenty20 debut for Jammu and Kashmir on 26 March 2015 in the 2014-15 Syed Mushtaq Ali Trophy. He made his List A debut for Jammu and Kashmir in the 2017–18 Vijay Hazare Trophy on 8 February 2018.

References

External links
 

1998 births
Living people
Indian cricketers
Place of birth missing (living people)
Jammu and Kashmir cricketers